Clay Bennett (born January 20, 1958 in Clinton, South Carolina) is an American editorial cartoonist. His cartoons typically present liberal viewpoints. Currently drawing for the Chattanooga Times Free Press, Bennett is the recipient of the 2002 Pulitzer Prize for Editorial Cartooning.

Graduating from the University of North Alabama in 1980, Bennett briefly served as a staff artist at the Pittsburgh Post-Gazette and the Fayetteville Times (NC).  He worked as editorial cartoonist at the St. Petersburg Times for 13 years (1981–1994) but was fired in 1994. While Bennett's editor Phil Gailey denied the firing was politically motivated, many observers saw it as part of the traditionally liberal newspaper's trend towards becoming more conservative. Bennett said "Many saw the termination as political because I was out there on the far left. Obviously expressing your point of view can cost you your job." He later worked for The Christian Science Monitor (1997–2007) and now draws five cartoons a week for the Chattanooga Times Free Press, having joined its staff in 2007.

A nominated finalist for The Pulitzer Prize for Editorial Cartooning seven times, Bennett won the Prize in 2002. He's also the recipient of the Sigma Delta Chi Award, the National Journalism Award, the Robert F. Kennedy Journalism Award, the John Fischetti Award, the National Headliner Award, the Thomas Nast Award from the Overseas Press Club, the Berryman Award from the National Press Foundation, the Ranan Lurie/United Nations Political Cartoon Award and the National Cartoonists Society's Award for Editorial Cartoons.

A past president of the Association of American Editorial Cartoonists, Bennett lives in Chattanooga with his wife, artist Cindy Procious. His work is syndicated internationally by Counterpoint Licensing and Syndication.

Awards
 2019 Sigma Delta Chi Award, Society of Professional Journalists
 2019 Green Eyeshade Award for Editorial Cartoons, Society of Professional Journalists
 2018 Green Eyeshade Award for Editorial Cartoons, Society of Professional Journalists
 2017 Divisional Award for Editorial Cartoons, National Cartoonists Society
 2017 Sigma Delta Chi Award, Society of Professional Journalists
 2017 Thomas Nast Award, Overseas Press Club of America
 2016 Green Eyeshade Award for Editorial Cartoons, Society of Professional Journalists
 2016 National Headliner Award for Editorial Cartoons
 2014 Clifford K. and James T. Berryman Award for Editorial Cartooning, National Press Foundation
 2014 Green Eyeshade Award for Editorial Cartoons, Society of Professional Journalists
 2013 Grambs Aronson Award for Cartooning with a Conscience, Hunter College
 2013 Champion of Equality, Tennessee Equality Project
 2012 Green Eyeshade Award for Editorial Cartoons, Society of Professional Journalists
 2011 Green Eyeshade Award for Editorial Cartoons, Society of Professional Journalists
 2011 United Nations/Ranan Lurie Political Cartoon Awards 
 2010 Green Eyeshade Award for Editorial Cartoons, Society of Professional Journalists
 2009 Green Eyeshade Award for Editorial Cartoons, Society of Professional Journalists
 2008 Ink Bottle Award, Association of American Editorial Cartoonists
 2007 Thomas Nast Award, Overseas Press Club of America
 2007 Robert F. Kennedy Journalism Award for Cartoons
 2005 Thomas Nast Award, Overseas Press Club of America
 2005 John Fischetti Award for Editorial Cartooning
 2005 Alumni of the Year, University of North Alabama
 2004 Grand Prize, National Population Cartoon Contest
 2004 National Headliner Award for Editorial Cartoons
 2002 Pulitzer Prize for Editorial Cartooning
 2002 NCS Award for Editorial Cartoons, National Cartoonists Society
 2002 National Journalism Award, Scripps Howard Foundation
 2001 Sigma Delta Chi Award, Society of Professional Journalists
 2001 John Fischetti Award for Editorial Cartooning
 2001 Editorial Cartoonist of the Year, Editor & Publisher magazine
 2000 National Headliner Award for Editorial Cartoons
 1999 National Headliner Award for Editorial Cartoons
 1994 Green Eyeshade Award for Editorial Cartoons, Society of Professional Journalists
 1990 Jane Roe Media Award, Florida Abortion Rights Action League
 1986 H. L. Mencken Award for Best Cartoon, Free Press Association
 1984 Green Eyeshade Award for Editorial Cartoons, Society of Professional Journalists
 1979 Society for Collegiate Journalists Award for Editorial Cartoons

Nominations and Citations
 2022 Finalist, Green Eyeshade Award for Editorial Cartoons, Society of Professional Journalists
 2020 Finalist, National Headliner Award for Editorial Cartoons 
 2020 Finalist, Green Eyeshade Award for Editorial Cartoons, Society of Professional Journalists
 2018 Finalist, NCS Award for Editorial Cartoons, National Cartoonists Society
 2017 Finalist, National Headliner Award for Editorial Cartoons 
 2017 Finalist, Green Eyeshade Award for Editorial Cartoons, Society of Professional Journalists
 2015 Citation for Excellence, United Nations/Ranan Lurie Political Cartoon Awards 
 2015 Finalist, Green Eyeshade Award for Editorial Cartoons, Society of Professional Journalists
 2014 Finalist, NCS Award for Editorial Cartoons, National Cartoonists Society
 2014 Finalist, Herblock Prize
 2013 Finalist, NCS Award for Editorial Cartoons, National Cartoonists Society
 2013 Finalist, Pulitzer Prize for Editorial Cartooning
 2013 Finalist, National Headliner Award for Editorial Cartoons 
 2012 Finalist, NCS Award for Editorial Cartoons, National Cartoonists Society
 2010 Citation for Excellence, United Nations/Ranan Lurie Political Cartoon Awards 
 2009 Finalist, Thomas Nast Award,  Overseas Press Club of America  
 2009 Finalist, International Editorial Cartoon Competition, Canadian Committee for World Press Freedom
 2009 Finalist, National Headliner Award for Editorial Cartoons 
 2008 Finalist, Pulitzer Prize for Editorial Cartooning
 2008 Finalist, Green Eyeshade Award for Editorial Cartoons, Society of Professional Journalists
 2007 Citation for Excellence, United Nations/Ranan Lurie Political Cartoon Awards 
 2006 Citation for Excellence, United Nations/Ranan Lurie Political Cartoon Awards 
 2003 Finalist, Pulitzer Prize for Editorial Cartooning
 2001 Finalist, Pulitzer Prize for Editorial Cartooning
 2001 Finalist, National Journalism Award, Scripps Howard Foundation 
 2000 Finalist, Pulitzer Prize for Editorial Cartooning
 1999 Finalist, Pulitzer Prize for Editorial Cartooning

References

External links
 Clay Bennett at Times Free Press
 Facebook page
 Cartoon gallery
 
Billy Ireland Cartoon Library & Museum Art Database

1958 births
Living people
American editorial cartoonists
Pulitzer Prize for Editorial Cartooning winners
The Christian Science Monitor people
Tampa Bay Times
University of North Alabama alumni
People from Clinton, South Carolina